Denmark competed at the 2012 Winter Youth Olympics in Innsbruck, Austria. The Danish team was made up of 5 athlete competing in 3 different sports.

Alpine skiing

Denmark qualified one boy and girl in alpine skiing.

Boy

Girl

Cross country skiing

Denmark qualified a team of one boy and one girl.

Boy

Girl

Sprint

Speed skating

Denmark qualified one male athlete.

Boy

See also
Denmark  at the 2012 Summer Olympics

References

2012 in Danish sport
Nations at the 2012 Winter Youth Olympics
Denmark at the Youth Olympics